Mount Pintian is a mountain in Taiwan.

Geology

See also
100 Peaks of Taiwan
List of mountains in Taiwan
Shei-Pa National Park

References

Pintian
Landforms of Taichung